The HX convoys were a series of North Atlantic convoys which ran during the Battle of the Atlantic in the Second World War. They were east-bound convoys and originated in Halifax, Nova Scotia from where they sailed to ports in the United Kingdom. They absorbed the BHX convoys from Bermuda en route. Later, after the United States entered the war, HX convoys began at New York.

A total of 377 convoys ran in the campaign, conveying a total of about 20,000 ships. Thirty-eight convoys were attacked (about 10%), resulting in losses of 110 ships in convoy; a further 60 lost straggling, and 36 while detached or after dispersal, with losses from marine accident and other causes, for a total loss of 206 ships, or about 1% of the total.

History
The HX designation perpetuated a similar series that ran in First World War Atlantic Campaign in 1917 and 1918. HX convoys were organized at the beginning of the Atlantic campaign and ran without major changes until the end, the longest continuous series of the war.

These were initially considered fast convoys made up of ships that could make . A parallel series of slow convoys, the SC series, was run for ships making  or less, while ships making more than 13 knots sailed independently, until  CU series were organized in late 1943. The largest convoy of World War II was HX 300 which sailed for the UK, via New York, on 17 July 1944, with 167 merchant ships. It arrived in the UK, without incident, on 3 August 1944.

Convoy battles
As the HX convoys were comparatively fast convoys, they were less vulnerable to U-boat attack than the slow convoys, but they still witnessed some of the great convoy battles of the war. Over the entire campaign, there were 40 convoys that lost more than 6 ships; of those 40 convoys, 5 were in the HX series.

 HX 79 Attacked by a U-boat wolf pack in October 1940.  12 ships were lost, which, with the attack on Convoy SC 7 on the same day made the worst day's shipping losses of the entire Atlantic campaign.
Five ships were quickly sunk, but the sacrifice of the armed merchant cruiser  and the armed merchant ship SS Beaverford along with failing light allowed the rest of the convoy to escape. The oil tanker  was part of this convoy.
 HX 106 On 8 February 1941 the two German small battleships,  and  appeared over the horizon. The presence of the escorting battleship  was enough to deter an attack.
 HX 112 Attacked in March 1941, this battle was notable for seeing the loss to the German navy of two of its U-boat aces, Otto Kretschmer and Joachim Schepke.
 HX 156 was being escorted by the United States Navy in October, 1941, when  torpedoed , the first US warship sunk in the Second World War.
 HX 212 suffered the heaviest loss of any HX convoy in 1942.
 HX 228 Was one of several convoys attacked sequentially in March 1943. Two U-boats were destroyed while sinking four merchant ships and the escort commander's destroyer.
 HX 229. Attacked in March 1943, this action, which converged with the action around SC 122, was the largest convoy battle of the Atlantic campaign.

Notes

References

External links
 Private page about the convoys
 Full list of ships sailing in HX convoys
 HMS Jervis Bay and the battle of HX84

HX 0
Battle of the Atlantic